Dargah-e Sheykhan or Dargah-e Shaykhan or Dargah-i-Shaikhan may refer to:
 Dargah-e Sheykhan, Baneh
 Dargah-e Sheykhan, Marivan